Aurélien-Emmanuel Hérisson simply known as Aurélien Hérisson (born February 17, 1990) is a French Brazilian goalkeeper who plays for French team US Montagnarde.

Statistics

References

External links

 Aurélien Hérisson Interview
 Aurélien Hérisson, itinerary of a flying goalkeeper

1990 births
Association football goalkeepers
Brazilian footballers
French footballers
Living people
Singapore Premier League players
Expatriate footballers in Singapore
Tanjong Pagar United FC players
Sportspeople from Paraíba